Sergei Yakovlevich Lemeshev (– 27 June 1977) was a Soviet and Russian opera singer and director. People's Artist of the USSR (1950).

Biography

Early life and career
Lemeshev was born into a peasant family, and his father wanted him to become a cobbler. In 1914, he left a parish school and was sent to be trained to make shoes in Saint Petersburg. In 1917, he graduated from school in Tver, where he received vocal training. He began first at a local workers' club and later moved to Moscow.

Between 1921 and 1925, he studied at the Moscow Conservatory with Nazari Raisky. In 1924, he sang in the opera studio of Konstantin Stanislavski. From 1926 and 1931, he sang in the theatres of Sverdlovsk, Harbin, and Tbilisi.

In 1931 Lemeshev was invited to the Bolshoi Theatre, made his debut and eventually became the theatre's soloist. His lyrical tenor of an unusually soft and light timbre almost at once brought him love and popularity among admirers of the operatic art. Nevertheless, Lemeshev was a great worker and worked hard to develop each of his opera roles. His vocal and artistic qualities, evident to every listener, are beauty of timbre, musicality, effortlessness of vocal production, expressiveness, very clear diction and incredible pianissimo. The best years of his operatic career were from 1931 to 1942. He was also an outstanding concert singer and a brilliant performer of traditional Russian folk songs. In 1938, he became the first artist to sing all 100 romances by Tchaikovsky in 5 concerts. Folk songs broadcast on the radio further sealed his stature as a truly national singer.

Health
The beginning of the Great Patriotic War was crucial for Lemeshev; during one evacuation he caught a very bad cold which resulted in two attacks of pneumonia, complicated by pleurisy and tuberculosis of the right lung. He was treated with artificial pneumothorax, which induced the therapeutic collapse of one lung. Although singing was forbidden, he adapted by being more conscious and sensitive with regard to his technique, and continued to sing with one lung from 1942 to 1948, when the other lung was also artificially collapsed and re-inflated. During that period he recorded Lakmé, The Snow Maiden, Les pêcheurs de perles, Mozart and Salieri and pieces from operas like The Barber of Seville and Rigoletto.

In 1947, he toured and performed at the Berlin State Opera. Along with his friendly rival, tenor Ivan Kozlovsky, he was the leading tenor at the Bolshoi until 1956.

Repertoire
Lemeshev's operatic repertoire consisted primarily of Russian works along with a particularly significant number of French and a few Italian and German pieces. Almost all works were performed in the Russian language. Unfortunately, very few complete recordings are available, with only excerpts available in spite of Lemeshev's numerous performances on stage in roles such as the Duke in Rigoletto and Almaviva in The Barber of Seville.

Rodolfo in La Bohème by Giacomo Puccini
Duke in Rigoletto by Giuseppe Verdi
Romeo in Roméo et Juliette by Charles Gounod
Almaviva in The Barber of Seville by Gioachino Rossini
Levko in May Night by Nikolai Rimsky-Korsakov
Alfredo in La Traviata by Giuseppe Verdi
Astrologer in The Golden Cockerel by Nikolai Rimsky-Korsakov
Vladimir Igorevich in Prince Igor by Alexander Borodin
Rodolfo in Luisa Miller by Giuseppe Verdi
Indian guest in Sadko by Nikolai Rimsky-Korsakov
Lohengrin in Lohengrin by Richard Wagner
Nadir in Les pêcheurs de perles by Georges Bizet
Doctor Faust in Faust by Charles Gounod
Tsar Berendei in The Snow Maiden by Nikolai Rimsky-Korsakov
Boyan in Ruslan and Ludmila by Mikhail Glinka
Prince Sidonal in The Demon by Anton Rubinstein
Dubrovsky in Dubrovsky by Eduard Napravnik
Gérald in Lakmé by Léo Delibes
Werther in Werther by Jules Massenet
Fra Diavolo in Fra Diavolo by Daniel Auber, among others.

Signature role as Lensky in Eugene Onegin
Lemeshev's signature role was as Lensky in Eugene Onegin by Pyotr Ilyich Tchaikovsky, and he performed it more than 500 times from 1927 onwards. He performed it for the last time on his 70th birthday, after suffering three heart attacks and having a lung removed.

Other key roles
In 1953 Lemeshev was given the prestigious title People's Artist of the USSR. He was also appointed assistant manager of the Bolshoi from 1957 to 1959. He debuted as director in 1951, with the production of La traviata in the Maly Opera Theatre in Leningrad (now known as the Mikhailovsky Theatre). Following this, he was made director for the production of Massenet's Werther in 1957 at the Bolshoi.

Toward the end of his career, he mainly gave concerts of Russian classic romances and folk songs, with performances aired on the radio, and taught in the Moscow Conservatory as associate professor.

He was buried in the Novodevichy Cemetery in Moscow.

Personal life
Six marriages and numerous affairs focused the attention of Lemeshev's fans on his personal life. His fourth wife was the famous soprano Irina Maslennikova, who gave birth to Lemeshev's daughter Maria.
Ultimately, he found his life partner in singer Vera Kudryavtseva. Their marriage lasted for over 20 years, until Lemeshev's death in 1977.

Legacy
He authored the book "The Way to Art", published in 1968.

Asteroid number 4561 received the name Lemeshev in 1978, a year after Sergei Lemeshev's death.

Recordings
Tchaikovsky - Eugene Onegin, cond. Georgy Doniyakh, Leningrad, Maly Theatre (CD) Label: Aquarius (1954 Live recording)
Tchaikovsky - Eugene Onegin, cond. Boris Khaikin, Bolshoi Theatre (CD) Label: Opera D'oro (1956 studio recording, remastered), 1999
Rimsky-Korsakov - May Night, cond. Vasili Nebolsin, Bolshoi Theatre (3 LP Monarch MWL 338-340), about 1948.
Scenes and Arias from Operas - Sergei Lemeshev (CD) Label: Yedang Entertainment, 2002
Lebendige Vergangenheit: Sergei Lemeshev, Preiser Records Audio CD (July 4, 1998)
A large number of CD's (42 so far) including 'live' concerts have been published by Aquarius, http://aquarius-classic.ru/albums?tid=6&ver=eng

more information

Bibliography
Vasiliev, Viktor Dmitrievich: Doroga k Lemeshevu, Tver', 2002,

External links 
 
Sergei Lemeshev at the Allmusic.com
Lemeshev sings Tchaikovsky's songs (free Mp3 downloads)
Operatic arias & folk songs (free Mp3 downloads)
Biography (in Russian)
Peoples.ru
Grandi Tenori
Voice of Russia: The Rivals
Biography of Sergei Lemeshev
 History of the Tenor / Sergei Lemeshev / Sound Clips and Narration
YouTube: SERGEI LEMESHEV - "Questa o Quella & La Donna e Mobile" from Rigoletto (in Russian)
YouTube: Sergei Lemeshev - "Una furtiva lagrima" from L'elisir d'amore (in Italian)
YouTube: Sergei Lemeshev - Pearlfishers/Nadir's romance (1938)
YouTube: Sergei Lemeshev - "На заре ты ее не буди/Don't wake her at dawn" (Russian romance)
YouTube: Sergei Lemeshev - "Тройка/Troika" (Russian folk song)
YouTube: "The Musical Story" (1941)

1902 births
1977 deaths
20th-century Russian male opera singers
People from Kalininsky District, Tver Oblast
People from Tver Governorate
People from Tverskoy Uyezd
Communist Party of the Soviet Union members
Academic staff of Moscow Conservatory
Moscow Conservatory alumni
Honored Artists of the RSFSR
People's Artists of the USSR
Stalin Prize winners
Recipients of the Order of Lenin
Russian music educators
Russian opera directors
Russian operatic tenors
Soviet male opera singers
Soviet music educators
Soviet opera directors
Soviet tenors
Burials at Novodevichy Cemetery